John Lane (fl. 1620) was an English poet. A good friend of John Milton the elder, he lacked university education. He published two poems, Tom Tel-troths Message and his Pens Complaint (1600), which was satirical, and An Elegie vpon the Death of the high and renowned Princesse our late Soueraigne Elizabeth (1603). He left a continuation of The Squire's Tale in manuscript, in two different versions, both now in the Bodleian Library (MS. Douce 170 and MS. Ashmole 53, part).

References

Year of birth unknown
Year of death unknown
17th-century English poets
17th-century English male writers
English male poets